Kawagoe (written: 川越) is a Japanese surname. Notable people with the surname include:

, Japanese baseball player
, Japanese anime director
, Japanese long jumper

Japanese-language surnames